Abduwali Abdulkadir Muse (born 1990) is a convicted Somali pirate. On 16 February 2011, Muse was sentenced to 33 years and 9 months in U.S. federal prison.

Muse was portrayed by Somali actor Barkhad Abdi in the 2013 film Captain Phillips, a dramatization of the hijacking.

Early life
Muse was born in Galkayo, a divided city in Somalia. The US Federal Bureau of Prisons states he was born in 1990, while his mother states he was born in 1992, and his father states he was born in 1993.

He grew up in poverty often without food or clothes. At a young age he was kicked in the face by a camel and lost two of his front teeth. By the age of 12, he was living alone and initially worked as an assistant to taxi drivers before working as a cook for fishermen. He was married in 2008 but could not afford to establish a home for himself and his wife.

At a hearing to determine Muse's age, Assistant United States Attorney Brendan McGuire said to U.S. Magistrate Judge Andrew J. Peck, that Muse had told Americans he was variously 16, 18, 19 and 26 years old.

Attack on Maersk Alabama

According to his indictment, Muse was the first of the four men who boarded Maersk Alabama. During the attack, he was stabbed in the hand by a sailor. The crew attacked and held Muse hostage while Richard Phillips offered him and the pirates money to leave Maersk Alabama safely on the ship's lifeboat. However Muse's fellow pirates forced Phillips into the lifeboat before Maersk Alabama'''s crew could release Muse. All four pirates escaped the ship, with Phillips held hostage inside the lifeboat. A day later USS Bainbridge intercepted the lifeboat and navy officers negotiated with the armed pirates for hours and agreed to take Muse on board Bainbridge to "meet" with elders from his clan to negotiate the release of Phillips. After Muse had been taken on board, the three remaining pirates were shot dead simultaneously by Navy SEAL sharpshooters before Muse was charged and taken into American custody. Muse was thought to be the first person to be charged with piracy in an American court in more than 100 years, when courts ruled in 1885 that Ambrose Light was not a pirate vessel. A more recent case, 2008's United States v. Shi, which was quoted in his indictment, involves murder and a crew member taking over a ship and holding a hostage.

Additional attacks
In 2010, Muse was charged in connection with two additional attacks on international shipping. The indictment does not name the two vessels involved, hijacked in March and April 2009. However, they are likely to include the 700-ton fishing vessel Win Far 161, which was used as a mother ship in other attacks, including the Maersk Alabama hijacking. Two of the Win Far 161's crew, one sailor from mainland China and the other from Indonesia, died of illness.

Trial
Muse was tried in the United States District Court for the Southern District of New York in New York City.

There was some confusion as to his age. According to the New York Daily News, he was at the time 17 to 19 years old. Muse was to stand trial in New York because of the local FBI office's expertise in handling cases where major crimes were perpetrated against Americans in Africa, such as the 1998 United States embassy bombings in Kenya and Tanzania. CBC News also reported that U.S. authorities had considered transferring him to authorities in Kenya per international agreement to prosecute pirate suspects.

When initially captured, U.S. officials reported Muse as being 16 to 20 years old, and that his name was Abduhl Wali-i-Musi. U.S. Secretary of Defense Robert Gates asserted that all four pirate suspects were between the ages of 17 and 19. On 20 April 2009, CBC News reported that U.S. officials indicated that investigators had confirmed Muse was over 18, which removed additional steps that would be required to prosecute him had it been determined that he was a minor.

Muse's mother, Adar Abdurahman Hassan, stated in a telephone interview with the Associated Press that U.S. authorities had both his name and age wrong. She indicated that he was only 16 years old and that his name was Abdi Wali Abdulqadir Muse. In an interview with the BBC Somali service, Muse's mother also appealed to the U.S. government and president to free her son, asserting that Muse had been lured into pirate activity by wealthy unnamed criminals.

In a court ruling on 21 April 2009, U.S. Magistrate Judge Andrew J. Peck decided Muse was not under 18 and that he could be tried as an adult. Muse was then brought to New York to face trial on charges including piracy under the law of nations, conspiracy to seize a ship by force, conspiracy to commit hostage-taking, and firearms related charges, carrying a potential of up to four life sentences. The charge of piracy has a mandatory life sentence (18 USC 1651), and there is no parole in U.S. federal prisons.

On 19 May 2009, a federal grand jury in New York returned a ten-count indictment against Muse.

Muse pleaded guilty to the hijacking, kidnapping and hostage-taking charges on 18 May 2010. Charges of piracy and possession of a machine gun were dropped in exchange for the guilty plea.

On 16 February 2011, Muse was sentenced to 33 years and 9 months in federal prison.

Imprisonment
Muse was initially incarcerated (and currently resides) at the Federal Correctional Institution, Terre Haute in the Communications Management Unit. His projected release date is 20 June 2038. He was moved to Edgefield Federal Correctional Institution temporarily, but has since been transferred back to Terre Haute as of November 2020.

Muse worked as a prison orderly, although his wage was garnished to pay the restitution he owes for the hijacking as well as a court fee. He said he spent his free time in prison watching TV, reading and writing. In 2016, he acquired a GED. While in Terre Haute he received his first English lesson from Mufid Abdulqader who had been sentenced to 20 years in prison after the Holy Land Foundation trial. He spent some time in solitary confinement for being "disruptive".
In popular culture
Muse was portrayed by Somali actor Barkhad Abdi in the 2013 film Captain Phillips'', a dramatization of the events in 2009, also starring Tom Hanks as the titular character. The film received a nomination for Best Picture, and Abdi was nominated for the Academy Award for Best Supporting Actor for his portrayal of Muse.

References

External links
 Muse's criminal docket on Court Listener.
 Indictment (U.S. v. Abduwali Abdukhadir Muse), 19 May 2009 FindLaw
 Criminal Complaint (U.S. v. Abduwali Abdukhadir Muse), 21 April 2009 FindLaw

Living people
People from Galkayo
21st-century Somalian people
Hijackers
Kidnappers
Somalian pirates
21st-century pirates
Prisoners and detainees of the United States federal government
Sole survivors
Somalian criminals
Somalian people imprisoned abroad
1990 births